The 1961–62 season saw Rochdale compete for their 3rd season in the Football League Fourth Division. This season also saw Rochdale reach final of the League Cup.

Statistics
																				

|}

Final League Table

Competitions

Football League Fourth Division

Expunged Games

F.A. Cup

League Cup

Lancashire Cup

Rose Bowl

References

Rochdale A.F.C. seasons
Rochdale